Karl, Duke of Schleswig-Holstein-Sonderburg-Glücksburg (30 September 1813 – 24 October 1878) was Duke of Schleswig-Holstein-Sonderburg-Glücksburg from 1831 to 1878. Karl was the eldest son of Friedrich Wilhelm, Duke of Schleswig-Holstein-Sonderburg-Glücksburg, and Princess Louise Caroline of Hesse-Kassel and an elder brother of Christian IX of Denmark. Karl became Duke of Schleswig-Holstein-Sonderburg-Glücksburg upon his father's death on 27 February 1831.

Marriage
Karl married Princess Vilhelmine Marie of Denmark, daughter of Frederick VI of Denmark and his wife Marie Sophie of Hesse-Kassel, on 19 May 1838 at Amalienborg Palace in Copenhagen, Denmark. Vilhelmine Marie was the former wife of Prince Frederick of Denmark (later Frederick VII of Denmark). He died on 24 October 1878 at age 65 at Luisenlund. Karl and Vilhelmine Marie died without issue. Many believe that she was barren as there are no records of her having any miscarriages or stillbirths.

Ancestry

References

External links

Dukes of Schleswig-Holstein-Sonderburg-Glücksburg
Princes of Schleswig-Holstein-Sonderburg-Glücksburg
1813 births
1878 deaths
People from Schleswig, Schleswig-Holstein
House of Schleswig-Holstein-Sonderburg-Beck
Recipients of the Cross of Honour of the Order of the Dannebrog
Grand Crosses of the Order of the Dannebrog
Recipients of the Order of St. Anna, 1st class